The 1931 European Rowing Championships were rowing championships held on the Seine in the French capital city of Paris in the suburb of Suresnes. The competition was for men only and they competed in all seven Olympic boat classes (M1x, M2x, M2-, M2+, M4-, M4+, M8+).

Medal summary

References

European Rowing Championships
European Rowing Championships
Rowing
Rowing
Sports competitions in Paris
European